Dwarfstar is a fictional DC Comics supervillain introduced by Gail Simone in The All-New Atom # 2. He was the archenemy of Ryan Choi.

Dwarfstar made his live-action debut in the fourth season of The Flash, portrayed by Derek Mears.

Fictional character biography
Sylbert Rundine is a rapist and serial killer who preys on the dormitories of Ivy University. In his first appearance, he acquires a Bio-Belt similar to the one worn by college professor Ryan Choi and becomes the super-villain Dwarfstar. By the time of his last appearance, he was revealed to be the "first son" of Lady Chronos.

He aged due to a forced stay in a time-accelerated micro-universe, leaving him even more mentally unhinged than before. He vanished along with Chronos and Lady Chronos. A master assassin as well as the shrinking nemesis of Atom, Dwarfstar is a constant thorn in Ryan's side during his tenure as Atom. The two men were actually connected in ways they were unaware of. A woman from Ryan's past was the reason that both men gained their shrinking belts, though Ryan was deceived to believe it was from Ray Palmer himself. The woman, Jia, who was a former flame of Ryan's, would later turn to a life of crime and become the time warping villain Lady Chronos. She refers to Dwarfstar as her "firstborn," probably referring to her connection to his acquisition of his power belt and not his actual birth.

Dwarfstar hired Deathstroke and his group of mercenaries, who called themselves Titans, to kill his nemesis Ryan Choi, a physics professor and costumed hero known as the Atom. Deathstroke along with Cheshire, the Tattooed Man, Cinder, and the recently resurrected Osiris carried out the sadistic mission. After a horrendous confrontation at Ryan's home he was beaten and stabbed. Dwarfstar meets Deathstroke the morning after the mission at Patriot Park so he could receive his trophy. After he confirmed the money was transferred he was given a matchbox that contained Ryan Choi's dead body.

Shortly after hiring Deathstroke's team to kill Ryan Choi, Dwarfstar joined Bane's gang, the Secret Six — a team that includes Choi's girlfriend Giganta. During a mission where Spy Smasher sent the team to Skartaris, Dwarfstar makes a comment about the Atom, which leads Giganta to tell him she's the Atom's girlfriend. Dwarfstar snidely remarks "Really? How funny. Small world, huh?"  
 
After Bane's Secret Six comes into a stalemate with Amanda Waller's team, the two groups head back to Belle Reve to meet with Waller, who wants the Six to work for her. When the team leaves, Waller's agent Tremor brings up Dwarfstar's history of being a serial killer and rapist. Waller knows this, but simply says "I don't think it's going to work out for him on this team, do you?" 
 
A short time later, Giganta invites Dwarfstar to her hotel room, where she attempts to seduce him. She begins to undress and kiss him, saying she has a fetish for small men, and that her boyfriend has the same ability. She asks if Dwarfstar knows him, then punches him yelling "His name was Ryan, you sick son of a bitch!" Revealing that Waller told her about Choi's death, Giganta, with Dwarfstar's belt, proceeds to beat him to a bloody mess. With Dwarfstar begging for his life, Giganta duct tapes his mouth shut as she continues to nearly beat him to death.

During this same period, Ray Palmer begins an investigation into the disappearance of Ryan, who had been murdered by Deathstroke. Atom comforts Ryan's former girlfriend Amanda, and muses Ryan may be hiding out like he did after the events of Identity Crisis. While investigating to his micro size, Ray discovers microbiological blood. He arrives at the Hall of Justice to tell the League members that Ryan is missing. The League helps Ray's investigation into Ryan's whereabouts. He discovers Ryan's DNA cell is not a match for the blood that was found. The DNA cell belongs to someone else.

Later, Ray discovers evidence that Dwarfstar had a hand in Ryan's death, and vows to find him and make him pay. Ray eventually finds Dwarfstar in a hospital, where he is recovering from the severe injuries he sustained from his torture at the hands of Giganta. Believing it may lead to a lighter sentence, Dwarfstar confesses to hiring Deathstroke to kill Ryan. Armed with this knowledge, Ray leaves to inform the Justice League, but not before informing Dwarfstar that Deathstroke would kill him for his betrayal.

Powers and abilities
Dwarfstar possesses the ability to alter his size down into subatomic levels while retaining his natural strength. This is accomplished by using these remnants of a white dwarf star made inside the Bio-Belt worn with his costume. Dwarfstar is the only villain that has 100% control over his body on the molecular scale, thus making him exponentially more powerful than he was often portrayed, but only limited by the application of his powers.

Dwarfstar is also an amateur poet and keenly skilled with the use of a hunting knife that he uses to torture or kill his victims.

In other media
 Dwarfstar makes a cameo appearance in the Batman: Brave and the Bold episode "Sword of the Atom!".
 Dwarfstar appears in the fourth season of The Flash, portrayed by Derek Mears. This version is a thief who acquired the power to miniaturize objects after the Thinker tricks the Flash into exposing him to dark matter. In the episode "Honey, I Shrunk Team Flash", Dwarfstar uses his powers to miniaturize valuable items so he can easily steal and transport them until he is defeated by Team Flash and remanded to Iron Heights Penitentiary. In the episode "True Colors", Dwarfstar and his fellow metahuman inmates attempt to escape after learning the warden intends to sell them to Amunet Black before the Thinker intercepts them and steals their powers, killing them in the process.

References

DC Comics supervillains
DC Comics characters who are shapeshifters
Characters created by Gail Simone
Fictional cannibals
Fictional characters who can change size
Fictional knife-fighters
Fictional poets
Fictional rapists
Fictional serial killers
Comics characters introduced in 2006